This article lists the international squads for the 2021 FIVB Volleyball Women's Under 20 World Championship.

The following is the Argentina roster in the 2021 FIVB Volleyball Women's U20 World Championship.

Head coach:  Pablo Martin Ambrosini

1 Nicole Dalma Pérez 
2 Aylén Ayub 
3 Julieta Sández 
4 Nayla Da Silva 
5 Catalina Rochaix 
6 Julieta Aruga 
7 Valentina Paredes 
8 Guadalupe Martín 
9 Valentina Vaulet 
10 Juana Giardini 
11 Bianca Cugno 
12 Milena Margaria 
13 Avril Garcia 
14 Julieta Holzmaisters 
15 Camila Giraudo 
16 Keila Llanos 
17 Agustina Campanella 
18 Josefina Ossvald 
19 Candela Yaccuzzi 
20 Victoria Caballero

The following is the Belarus roster in the 2021 FIVB Volleyball Women's U20 World Championship.

Head coach:  Volha Palcheuskaya

1 Liubou Svetnik 
3 Anastasija Svetnik 
4 Dziyana Vaskouskaya 
5 Kseniya Liabiodkina 
6 Viktoryia Kastsiuchyk 
7 Hanna Karabinovich 
8 Valeryia Turchyna 
9 Darya Sauchuk 
10 Anastasiya Shahun 
11 Lizaveta Bahayeva 
12 Darya Borys 
14 Darya Vakulka 
16 Darya Burak 
17 Marharyta Zakharanka 
27 Emilia Mikanovich

The following is the Belgium roster in the 2021 FIVB Volleyball Women's U20 World Championship.

Head coach:  Callens Fien

1 Romane Neufkens 
2 Pauline Martin 
3 Jana Thierens 
4 Dauke Vreys 
5 Annelore Engels 
6 Luna Van Acker 
7 Anna Koulberg 
8 Lena Versteynen 
9 Anouck Van Bouwel 
10 Bente Deckers 
11 Marie Lambrix 
12 Caitlin Van de Perre 
13 Sarah Kustermans 
15 Dorine Declat 
16 Noor Debouck 
17 Anastasija Zecevic

The following is the Brazil roster in the 2021 FIVB Volleyball Women's U20 World Championship.

Head coach:  Hairton Cabral De Oliveira

1 Istefani Dos Santos Silva 
2 Marcelle De Arruda Mattos Da Silva 
3 Ana Cecília Aparecida Lopes 
4 Jaqueline Schmitz 
5 Stephany Gomes Xavier Morete 
6 Kátia Larissa Machado Da Silva 
7 Luiza Vicente Da Silva 
8 Lívia Dos Santos Gomes Lima 
9 Emily Da Silva Nunes 
10 Emanuelle Dos Santos De Moura 
11 Maria Clara Albrecht Carvalhães 
12 Carolina Grossi De Souza Santos 
13 Gabriela Carneiro De Souza 
14 Ana Cristina De Souza 
15 Aline Kiatkowski Olegário 
16 Isis Bortolaso Simonetti  
17 Gabriela Santin 
18 Ana Luiza Rüdiger 
19 Amanda Santos Julião 
20 Letícia Araújo Almeida Holanda Moura

The following is the Dominican Republic roster in the 2021 FIVB Volleyball Women's U20 World Championship.

Head coach:  Cristian Miguel Cruz Zapata

1 Flormarie Heredia Colon 
2 Laura Virginia Paniagua Báez 
3 Yanelis Cabada Mendoza 
4 Erika Calderon Rosario 
5 Sarah Angel Cruz 
6 Leoneiry Marizol Cornelio Mendoza 
7 Perla De Jesus Aybar 
8 Joeliza Angelica Fis Mota 
9 Geraldine Sthefany Gonzalez 
10 Cherlin Abigail Antonio Basilio 
11 Leslie Michell Jerez Rosario 
12 Ailyn Miabela Liberato Gomez 
13 Ariana Fung Rodriguez 
14 Crismeily Grissel Rodriguez Camilo 
18 Darlenys Olivo Rodriguez 
19 Alanae Mireybys Margaritha Gonzalez 
23 Esthefany Rabit 
25 Romina Migelina Cornelio Medina

The following is the Egypt roster in the 2021 FIVB Volleyball Women's U20 World Championship.

Head coach:  Ahmed Fathy Mohamed

1 Nada Morgan 
2 Loujayn Sadek 
3 Sama Mohamed 
4 Malak Elbehiry 
5 Mariam Bakr 
6 Farah Alaydy 
7 Salma Mahmoud 
8 Sabine Ali 
9 Habiba Zaatar 
10 Farida Elhenawy 
11 Nour Ali 
12 Nada Hamdy Samir Mahmoud Hamdy 
13 Ayatallah Ahmed 
14 May Abdelmaguid 
16 Toqaallah Eassa 
17 Ayah Elnady 
18 Maha Zaki 
19 Malak Abdelaziz 
20 Farida Ibrahim

The following is the Italy roster in the 2021 FIVB Volleyball Women's U20 World Championship.

Head coach:  Massimo Bellano

1 Anna Eniola Adelusi 
2 Emma Graziani 
3 Dominika Giuliani 
4 Julia Ituma 
5 Sofia Monza 
6 Gaia Guiducci 
7 Claudia Consoli 
8 Maria Teresa Bassi 
9 Loveth Omoruyi  
10 Martina Armini 
11 Stella Nervini 
12 Giorgia Frosini 
13 Beatrice Gardini 
14 Anna Pelloia 
15 Katja Eckl 
16 Emma Cagnin 
17 Linda Nkiruka Nwakalor 
18 Binto Diop 
19 Emma Barbero 
20 Islam Gannar

The following is the Netherlands roster in the 2021 FIVB Volleyball Women's U20 World Championship.

Head coach:  Marko Klok

1 Kim Klein Lankhorst 
2 Romy Brokking 
3 Hyke Lyklema 
4 Jolien Knollema 
5 Sanne Konijnenberg 
6 Marije Ten Brinke 
7 Dagmar Mourits 
8 Jette Kuipers 
9 Britte Stuut 
10 Iris Vos 
11 Elles Dambrink 
12 Pleun van der Pijl 
14 Nicole Van De Vosse 
15 Anneclaire ter Brugge 
16 Jolijn De Haan 
17 Noa de Vos 
18 Puck Hoogers 
20 Rixt van de Wal

The following is the Poland roster in the 2021 FIVB Volleyball Women's U20 World Championship.

Head coach:  Wiesław Popik

1 Dominika Pierzchała 
2 Magda Stambrowska 
4 Martyna Leoniak 
5 Martyna Borowczak 
8 Julita Piasecka 
10 Oliwia Laszczyk 
11 Gabriela Lendzioszek 
13 Sonia Stefanik 
16 Julia Orzoł  
17 Klaudia Łyduch  
18 Daria Skomorowska  
19 Katarzyna Hyży  
20 Martyna Czyrniańska 
21 Karolina Drużkowska 
22 Katarzyna Partyka 
25 Justyna Jankowska 
26 Rozalia Moszyńska 
27 Martyna Łazowska 
98 Julia Bińczycka

The following is the Puerto Rico roster in the 2021 FIVB Volleyball Women's U20 World Championship.

Head coach:  Jose Ricardo Rivera Guinand

1 Valerie Garcia Irizarry 
2 Nahirka Malpica Vélez 
3 Alondra Javier Feliciano 
4 Ana Beatriz Fuertes Brito 
5 Valeria Pagán Muñoz 
6 María Verrier Núñez 
7 Gabriela Machín Borges 
8 Paola Martell Santiago 
9 Yarianis Suarez Velazquez 
10 Krystal Salgado Rodríguez 
11 Yomarielis García Núñez  
12 Nayelis Cabello Cuevas 
14 Sara Pomar Domínguez  
15 Valeria Figueroa Estrada   
16 María José Vázquez Ramos 
17 Karolina Rodríguez Méndez

The following is the Russia roster in the 2021 FIVB Volleyball Women's U20 World Championship.

Head coach:  Igor Kurnosov

1 Elizaveta Kochurina 
2 Valeriia Perova  
3 Tatiana Seliutina 
4 Polina Matveeva  
5 Anastasiia Chernova 
6 Tatiana Kostina 
7 Daria Zamanskaia 
8 Vita Akimova 
9 Elizaveta Popova 
10 Svetlana Gatina 
11 Ksenia Menshchikova 
12 Natalia Suvorova 
14 Varvara Shubina   
15 Valeriia Gorbunova 
16 Natalia Slautina 
18 Viktoriia Kobzar 
19 Ekaterina Gatina 
20 Yana Shelkovkina

The following is the Rwanda roster in the 2021 FIVB Volleyball Women's U20 World Championship.

Head coach:  Christophe Mudahinyuka

3 Charlotte Mushimiyimana 
4 Diane Mpuhwezimana  
5 Adeline Mutanguha  
6 Alianea Nirere 
7 Jolie Mukazi  
8 Yvonne Mugwaneza   
9 Solange Uwamariya   
10 Albertine Uwiringiyimana  
11 Aneth Kamaliza  
12 Aloysie Tuyishime  
13 Nancy Ndagijimana 
14 Hope Urwiririza

The following is the Serbia roster in the 2021 FIVB Volleyball Women's U20 World Championship.

Head coach:  Vladimir Vasović

1 Andrea Tišma 
2 Nina Mandović  
3 Minja Osmajić  
4 Bojana Gočanin   
5 Ana Drobnjak  
6 Valerija Savicević  
7 Aleksandra Uzelac   
8 Dunja Grabić  
9 Tijana Vrcelj   
10 Jovana Cvetkovic  
11 Hena Kurtagić  
12 Ana Malešević   
13 Nevena Sajić  
14 Vanja Savić  
15 Isidora Kockarević   
16 Jovana Ćirković  
18 Branka Tica    
19 Stefana Pakić  
21 Vanja Ivanović  
23 Ksenija Tomić

The following is the Thailand roster in the 2021 FIVB Volleyball Women's U20 World Championship.

Head coach:  Nataphon Srisamutnak

1 Wiranyupa Inchan  
2 Kewalin Chuemuangphan  
3 Amonrada Loeksawang 
4 Sasiprapa Maneewong   
5 Wimonrat Thanapan  
7 Aree Seemok 
8 Naphat Rueangdet   
9 Jidapa Nahuanong   
10 Saowapha Soosuk  
12 Pimtawan Thongyos  
14 Kanyarat Kunmuang   
15 Suphatcha Khamtrareaksa  
16 Waranya Srilaoong  
17 Pajaree Maneesri   
18 Tanawan Arunmuang   
19 Chanunya Kamolklang    
20 Panatda Chaiyaphet  
21 Thatdao Kanwitthayi

The following is the Turkey roster in the 2021 FIVB Volleyball Women's U20 World Championship.

Head coach:  Sahin Catma

1 Tuna Aybüke Cetinay   
2 Sude Hacimustafaoğlu  
3 Selin Adalı  
4 Karmen Aksoy    
5 Çağla Salih 
7 Elif Su Eriçek  
8 Hilal Kocakara   
10 Lila Şengün   
11 Hanife Nur Özaydinli  
14 Sude Naz Uzun  
15 İpar Özay Kurt  
16 Damla Tokman   
18 Aleyna Göçmen   
19 Beren Yeşilırmak  
20 Pelin Eroktay   
21 Gülce Güçtekin  
23 Aybüke Güldenoğlu  
26 Melisa Ege Bükmen  
27 Miray Gözübüyük  
32 Deniz Nazlican Zengin

The following is the United States' roster in the 2021 FIVB Volleyball Women's U20 World Championship.

Head coach:  Dan Fisher

1 Lexi Rodriguez   
2 Hattie Monson    
3 Elena Oglivie  
4 Sydney Reed      
5 Allison Jacobs  
6 Kamerynn Miner   
7 Averi Carlson   
8 Anna Herrington  
9 Sarah White  
10 Reagan Hope  
11 Jordan Middleton  
12 Caroline Crawford   
13 Shaylee Shore    
14 Emily Londot   
15 Katelyn Smith   
16 Gabrielle Essix 
17 Lindsay Krause  
18 volleyball  
19 Allysa Batenhorst  
20 Carter Booth

References

FIVB Volleyball Women's U20 World Championship
Volleyball-related lists
FIVB Women's U20 World Championship
FIVB Volleyball World Championship squads